Luz y unión (Spanish: Light and union) was a Spanish language spiritualist magazine which was published in Barcelona between 1900 and 1914. It was the official organ of the Kardecian Spiritualist Union of Catalonia.

History and profile
Luz y unión was started as a merger of two magazines, La Luz del Porvenir and La Unión Espiritista. The Kardecian Spiritualist Union of Catalonia was the owner of the magazine and was composed of different groups, mainly Catalan, French and Latin American. Jacinto Esteva Marata was the director of the magazine of which editor-in-chief was the Andalusian writer Amalia Domingo Soler. It had correspondents in different countries, including Argentina, the Dominican Republic, Brazil, Cuba and Nicaragua.

Luz y unión published articles on spiritism which also contained an evaluation of its development in Spain. The magazine was published four times a month with eight-page numbers and later became a monthly publication with thirty-pages. From 1902 its title was renamed as Luz y unión. Revista de estudios psicológicos (Spanish: Light and union, magazine of psychological studies). 

The magazine was published until 1914 when it was replaced by another magazine entitled Luz, unión y verdad.

References

1900 establishments in Spain
1914 disestablishments in Spain
Defunct magazines published in Spain
Magazines about spirituality
Magazines established in 1900
Magazines disestablished in 1914
Magazines published in Barcelona
Monthly magazines published in Spain
Spanish-language magazines